Kanthapillai Velupillai Nadarajah (6 July 1905 – October 2000) was a leading Ceylon Tamil lawyer and Member of Parliament.

Early life and family
Nadarajah was born on 6 July 1905. He was the son of K. Velupillai and Atchikuddy. Nadarajah was educated at Jaffna Central College and Parameshwara College, Jaffna. After school he joined Ceylon University College. He then entered Colombo Law College, qualifying as a proctor.

Nadarajah married Gnanamani, daughter of P. S. Eliyatamby. They had a son (Bala).

Career
Nadarajah started practising law in Badulla in 1930. He continued practising in Uva Province for 54 years.

Nadarajah was a member of Badulla Urban Council for more than ten years. He contested the 1947 parliamentary election as an independent candidate in Bandarawela and was elected to Parliament.

Nadarajah was president of the Badulla Saiva Paripalana Sangam and managing trustee of the Kathir-velauthar Swami Temple in Badulla. He was the founder of first Tamil school in Uva and served as the manager of Badualla Saraswathi Minor and Maha Vidayalam for 30 years.

Later life
Nadarajah's family home in Pingarawa was burnt to the ground during the Black July anti-Tamil riots of 1983. Nadarajah fled to Colombo with assistance of J. C. T. Kotelawala, the former MP for Badulla.

References

External links
 The Plea That Went Unheeded, Tamil Nation

1905 births
2000 deaths
20th-century Sri Lankan lawyers
Alumni of Ceylon Law College
Alumni of Jaffna Central College
Alumni of Parameshwara College, Jaffna
Alumni of the Ceylon University College
Ceylonese proctors
Local authority councillors of Sri Lanka
Members of the 1st Parliament of Ceylon
People from Northern Province, Sri Lanka
Sri Lankan Tamil lawyers
Sri Lankan Tamil politicians